Les Ardoines station (French: Gare des Ardoines)  is a station in Paris' express suburban rail system, the RER. In the future, this will be a station on Paris Metro Line 15. It is on the Paris–Bordeaux railway. It serves the commune of Vitry-sur-Seine, in the Val-de-Marne department.

See also
List of stations of the Paris RER

External links

 

Railway stations in France opened in 1977
Réseau Express Régional stations
Railway stations in Val-de-Marne